St. Basil the Great Parish is located in Kimberton, PA, near Phoenixville.

History
St. Basils was founded on June 9, 1965. The original 275 families received word from Philadelphia that a parish would be established in Kimberton and would be called the Parish of St. Basil the Great.  Rev. William H. Finigan, who was the Assistant Pastor at the Church of St. Matthew in Conshohocken at the time, was named as the first Pastor.  The official groundbreaking for the first church took place on November 14, 1965.

The original church was dedicated by Archbishop John Krol (who would later be named Cardinal) on Saturday June 18, 1966... just a little over a year from the date the parish was established. Other construction on the site followed and the current rectory and convent were completed about a year later, in August 1967.

The parish school opened on September 11, 1967, and had a grand total of 113 students.  The school had the help of four religious sisters from the order of the Handmaids of the Sacred Heart of Jesus and two lay teachers who made up the first faculty at the new school. The founding Principal, who also taught fourth grade at that time, was Sr. Ruth Held, ACJ.  The first class to complete eighth grade at the school numbered 18 students.  The first Commencement was held on June 12, 1970.

The first big change for St. Basil's happened in 1977.  After 12 years as Pastor, Fr. Finigan was transferred to be Pastor of St. Joan of Arc Church in Philadelphia.  The new Pastor was to be Rev. Joseph A. Shields, JCD. Following his ordination on May 26, 1949, Fr. Shields attended Catholic University, and in 1962 he received a Doctorate in Canon Law. Prior to the St. Basil assignment, he had been in the field of education for 21 years, most recently being the founding Principal of Archbishop Wood High School for Girls and remaining for 13 years.

On Labor Day 1977, Rev. Robert A. McLaughlin arrived to assist at St. Basil's.  At the time, Fr. McLaughlin had just begun his teaching assignment at Bishop Kenrick High School in Norristown.  In 1981-1982 the church received a facelift through the hard work of many parishioners under the direction of Fr. McLaughlin.  The existing moldings and rosettes on the sanctuary walls were stripped as well as the birch paneling.  Some talented parishioners made the wainscoting and built the reredos from procured mahogany and gold molding. They installed new doors under the wall that separated the church from the hall and hung the folding walls.  The large window behind the altar was closed in with insulation, paneling and bricks to match the outside walls, the altar walls were papered, the cement block walls were covered with fieldstone façade and the windows were “stained.’  Fr. McLaughlin remained at St. Basils until June 1982, when he was transferred to be Chaplain at Temple University Newman Center, Philadelphia.

In 1998, Fr. McLaughlin returned to St. Basils, this time as pastor.  He immediately began making plans to design and build a new, permanent church.  This church was dedicated on January 15, 2005, by Cardinal Justin Rigali.

Education
The designated school for St. Basil the Great is Holy Family School in Phoenixville. Previously St. Basil had its own parish school. In 2012 it had 174 students, one of the smallest such figures in the archdiocese, but at the time the archdiocese did not call for its closure.

References

External links
Parish Web Site
Holy Family Catholic School
 - Earlier archives at stbasils.org domain
Facebook Page

Churches in Chester County, Pennsylvania

Roman Catholic Archdiocese of Philadelphia
Roman Catholic churches in Pennsylvania